State Road 424 (FL 424) is a  state highway in Orange County, Florida, that runs from State Road 434 and County Road 424 on the Orlando-Lockhart city line to West Par Street and Edgewood Drive in northern Orlando.

The road's historic terminus is an intersection with Plymouth Sorrento Road in Plymouth. The road has since been downgraded to a county road and bisected by State Road 414, the Apopka Expressway. The current designation of County Road 424 (CR 424) begins at U.S. Route 441 in Apopka, is briefly interrupted by SR 414, and continues east to meet SR 424 and SR 434 on the Orlando city line.

Major intersections

References

External links

FDOT Map of Orange County (Including SR 424 and CR 424)

424
424